The 1999 Auto Trader RAC British Touring Car Championship featured 26 races across 13 rounds. It began on 5 April at Donington Park and concluded on 19 September at Silverstone. The driver's title was won by Laurent Aïello in his debut season driving for the Nissan works team, with his teammate David Leslie in second place. Reigning champion Rickard Rydell finished in third place.

One of the surprises of the season was the performance of independent driver Matt Neal. Driving for his father's Team Dynamics in a 1998 Nissan Primera, Neal became the first independent driver to win a championship race in the feature race of the first Donington round; series organisers TOCA had put up a reward for £250,000 for this achievement.

Background 
Six manufacturer backed teams contested the 1999 championship, Audi and Peugeot having withdrawn at the end 1998. Seven independent drivers appeared on the initial entry list however neither the Atford Ford Mondeo of Gareth Howell or the TRM Motorsport BMW 320i of Collin Gallie made an appearance.

Just a single tyre manufacturer was represented (Michelin) and all competitors used the same tyre, most notably including independent runners.

Night racing was introduced to the BTCC for the first time for the rounds at Snetterton in July. The pit lane and main spectator areas were floodlit, whilst other parts of the circuit were in total darkness. To aid the drivers eyesight for the sharp changes from light to dark, the cockpits had a soft red light glowing inside.

Team and driver changes 

Tom Walkinshaw Racing again ran Volvo's effort, defending champion Rickard Rydell came into the 1999 season with a new team-mate in Belgian Vincent Radermecker who had previously raced in the Belgian Procar series and replaced Italian Gianni Morbidelli.

1998 manufacturer champions Nissan once again entered two Primeras engineered by RML. David Leslie remained with the team for a third season and was joined by Frenchman Laurent Aiello, a former STW and French champion who took the seat vacated by Anthony Reid.

After a successful year in 1998 with Prodrive, Honda's effort was now to be run by WSR in a straight swap with Ford. James Thompson went into the season as title favourite and topped pre-season testing and he was joined by Peter Kox for the second year in a row. The team entered a third car for 1994 champion and STW Honda works driver Gabriele Tarquini at the Knockhill and Brands Hatch rounds.

The Williams campaign, running a pair of Renault Lagunas, was headed by Jason Plato who was promoted to lead driver following the departure of Alain Menu to Ford. He was joined by Jean-Christophe Boullion, a former Williams F1 test driver, Sauber F1 race driver and 1994 Formula 3000 champion. Boullion had missed out securing the Renault drive to Plato in 1997.

The Triple Eight Racing Vauxhall Vectras were driven by 1995 champion John Cleland, his 11th season driving for the manufacturer and he was joined by Yvan Muller following Audi's withdrawal. He replaced Derek Warwick who retired from full-time racing to focus on running the team.

Completing the factory team line-up was Ford, now run by Prodrive who had what many regarded as the strongest driver line up in the pit lane, with ’97 champion Alain Menu partnering ’98 runner-up Anthony Reid. They replaced the 1998 lineup of Will Hoy, Craig Baird and Nigel Mansell.

The Independents field was spearheaded by title favourite Matt Neal, whom had shown throughout 1998 his ability to mix it with the manufacturer backed teams.  Neal’s Dynamics team would again have a year old ex STW Primera at their disposal, a car that Neal had shared with Steven Richards at Bathurst in 1998.

1998 Vectra Challenge winner Mark Blair, entered a 1996 Vauxhall Vectra which had been a prize for winning the support series and had been driven by Mark Lemmer in 1998. The car was updated with the 1999 aero kit but was unable to use the latest specification engines.

Lee Brookes returned to the series driving a 1998 Honda Accord. Brookes missed four races after injuring his arm and then withdrew from the series after the second visit to Thruxton stating that nothing they did to the car made it competitive.

Paula Cook also drove a 1998 Honda Accord that she had previously driven in the final two rounds of 1998 and run by D.C Cook Motorsport. The team withdrew after the Snetterton rounds citing lack of budget.

Russell Spence started the season driving a 1998 Renault Laguna run by Arena International Spence would suffer a frightening crash at Oulton Park and step down soon after due to business commitments. He was replaced by 1991 champion Will Hoy from Snetterton onwards.

Season review 

The season would be dominated by Nissan. Aïello would notch up ten race victories to claim the title in what would be his first and only year in the British championship. Teammate David Leslie would be the Frenchman’s only sustained title challenger, finishing comfortably as runner-up. The Japanese marque would be one of several though to withdraw from the series at the end of the year.

Rickard Rydell’s hopes of defending his title were dashed early following six retirements in the first twelve races, but a return to form in the second half of the season allowed the Swede to finish as best of the rest behind the Nissan pair. New teammate Vincent Radermecker had a solid first season in Britain, racking up several podium finishes. Volvo however would join Nissan in departing the series come season’s end.

Honda’s season would be much the same as the previous one. James Thompson would win four races, but inconsistency prevented him from challenging the Nissans. Peter Kox would have an improved second year in Britain, his highlight being a maiden win under the lights at Snetterton.

Renault’s season would be characterised by a lack of development along with a string of engine failures, culminating in the French marque being the third to end their programme at the end of the season. Numerous retirements hampered new team-leader Jason Plato’s hopes of a title challenge, whilst rookie teammate Jean-Christophe Boullion was consistent but unspectacular, mustering only tenth in the standings.

Team newcomer Yvan Muller would continue Vauxhall’s resurgence from 1998, picking up their only win of the season at Brands Hatch and becoming a regular front runner. Veteran teammate John Cleland would have a disappointing season, finishing as last of the works drivers and subsequently announcing his retirement from racing at the end of the year.

The biggest disappointment however was the Prodrive Ford team. The car showed flashes of pace, but terrible inconsistency would result in just one race win, both Menu and Reid finishing outside the top ten in the drivers championship, and bottom of the manufacturers championship.

The most memorable story of the season was Matt Neal. At the opening meeting at Donington Park, he became the first independent to win a race outright in 11 years, collecting a £250,000 prize put up by TOCA. Good form in the first half of the year saw him threatening a title challenge against the works teams, but a lack of development on his Primera saw him fall down the standings as the season progressed.

Entry list

Calendar
All races were held in the United Kingdom.

Drivers Championship

No driver may collect more than one "Lead a Lap" point per race no matter how many laps they lead.
Drivers' top 22 results count towards the championship.

Note: bold signifies pole position (1 point awarded all races), italics signifies fastest lap.

* signifies that driver lead feature race for at least one lap (1 point given).

Michelin Cup for Independents

Manufacturers Championship

Teams Championship

Points System
The points system used for the 1999 British Touring Car Championship was as follows. For the drivers championship, 15 points were awarded to the winner of each race, 12 to second place, 10 for third and 8,6,5,4,3,2,1 for fourth to tenth place respectively. At the end of the season, drivers would drop their four lowest scores. A point would be awarded to the driver who achieved pole position for each race, and a point was awarded to anyone who led the feature race.

For the manufactures championship, the same number of points for the top ten finishing positions were awarded as for the drivers championship but only the top two per manufacturer would receive points for the manufacturer. At the end of the season, manufacturers would drop the points from their worst four rounds of the championship. No points were received for leading laps or pole position.

References

External links
 Complete results archive at TouringCars.Net
 teamdan.com

British Touring Car Championship seasons
Touring Car Championship